The 1953–54 National Hurling League was the 23rd season of the NHL, an annual hurling competition for the GAA county teams.

Division 1

Division 1A table

Division 1B table

Knock-out stage

Final

References

National Hurling League seasons
Lea
Lea